The Melbourne International Animation Festival (MIAF) is an annual animation festival held in Melbourne since 2001. Supported by the Australian Centre for the Moving Image, the Australian Film Commission and the Melbourne City Council, it is Australia's largest animation event. Over the course of the festival more than 200 films from over 30 separate countries are shown. Highlights of the festival include many guest artists and visiting animators, from both local and abroad. It was moved from the Australian Centre for the Moving Image to Treasury Theatre in 2019 due to the Australian Centre for the Moving Image being temporarily shut down for large-scale renovations.

Results

References

External links
Melbourne International Animation Festival
Australian Centre for the Moving Image

Animation film festivals
Film festivals in Melbourne
Film festivals established in 2001
2001 establishments in Australia